This is a list of rivers of Saskatchewan, a province of Canada.

The largest and most notable rivers are listed at the start, followed by rivers listed by drainage basin and then alphabetically.

Principal river statistics 

Source Statistics Canada

Rivers by drainage basin 

Arctic Ocean drainage basin
Fond du Lac River
Cree River
Rapid River
Geikie River
Clearwater River
Graham Creek
Firebag River
Hudson Bay drainage basin
Assiniboine River
Qu'Appelle River
Moose Jaw River
Avonlea Creek
Thunder Creek
Last Mountain Creek
Arm River
Lanigan Creek
Pheasant Creek
Wascana Creek
Whitesand River
Spirit Creek
Yorkton Creek
Crescent Creek
Souris River
Graham Creek
Antler River
Des Lacs River
Gainsborough Creek
Moose Mountain Creek
Long Creek
Pipestone Creek
Churchill River
Beaver River
Doré River
Waterhen River
Rusty Creek
Cold River
Martineau River
Cowan River
Big River
Meadow River
Makwa River
Smoothstone River
Whitefish River
Reindeer River
Nemei River
Cochrane River
Geikie River 
La Loche River
Dillon River
Rapid River
Montreal River
Waskesiu River
MacLennan River
Bow River
Nipekamew River
Nipekamew Creek
Saskatchewan River
Carrot River
Sturgeon-Weir River
Ballantyne River
Goose River
Torch River
White Gull Creek
Stewart Creek
Caribou Creek
Mossy River
McDougal Creek
North Saskatchewan River
Battle River
Eagle Creek
Spruce River
Sturgeon River 
Shell River
South Saskatchewan River
Red Deer River
Swift Current Creek (flows into Lake Diefenbaker)
Brightwater Creek
Fish Creek
Red Deer River
Armit River
Fir River
Etomami River
Pepaw River
Piwei River
Greenwater Creek
Swan River
Woody River
Midnight Creek
Gulf of Mexico drainage basin
Poplar River
Frenchman River
Battle Creek
Big Muddy Creek
Old Wives Lake endorheic basin (considered part of the Gulf of Mexico drainage basin)
Wood River
Bigstick Lake endorheic basin
Maple Creek

Alphabetical list of rivers

A

B

C

D

E

F

G

H

I

J

K

L

M

N

O

P

Q

R

S

T

U

V

W

Y

Z

See also 
List of lakes of Saskatchewan
Geography of Saskatchewan
List of rivers of Canada
Rivers of the Americas

References 

Saskatchewan

Rivers